VaksdalPosten (The Vaksdal Gazette) is a local Norwegian newspaper published once a week in Dale in Hordaland county. 

The paper covers events in the municipalities of Vaksdal and Modalen. The newspaper was established in 1987 and is published in Nynorsk. The paper is edited by Esben Hesjedal.

Circulation
According to the Norwegian Audit Bureau of Circulations and National Association of Local Newspapers, VaksdalPosten has had the following annual circulation:
2004: 2,401
2005: 2,397
2006: 2,395
2007: 2,405
2008: 2,339
2009: 2,326
2010: 2,306
2011: 2,270
2012: 2,250
2013: 2,253
2014: 2,295
2015: 2,273
2016: 2,143

References

External links
VaksdalPosten homepage

Newspapers published in Norway
Norwegian-language newspapers
Vaksdal
Mass media in Hordaland
Publications established in 1987
1987 establishments in Norway
Nynorsk